Z Square Mall is a shopping mall cum entertainment complex in the Indian city of Kanpur. The mall is spread on an area of five acres in the middle of Kanpur city with 900,000 sqft. of built-up area and the presence of more than 150 National & International brands. The mall is ranked as seventh largest mall in India by hellotravel, a reputed travel agency. It is ranked sixth largest in India by tripoto and traveljee. The mall is owned by reputed Zaz Tanners Group which has its leather industries in Jajmau, Kanpur and Unnao.

Location

The Mall is located in the city's most expensive area named as The Mall or Mall Road at Bada Chauraha Crossing. Its close proximity to Kanpur Central railway station and Naveen Market makes it the busiest retail destination in Kanpur. It is located at a distance of 17 kilometres from Chakeri Airport.

References

Buildings and structures in Kanpur
Shopping malls in Uttar Pradesh
Shopping malls established in 2010
2010 establishments in Uttar Pradesh